The election for Resident Commissioner to the United States House of Representatives took place on November 2, 1920, the same day as the larger Puerto Rican general election and the United States elections, 1920.

Candidates for Resident Commissioner
 Félix Córdova Dávila for the Union Party
 Prudencio Rivera Martínez for the Socialist Party
 Domingo Sepúlveda for the Republican Party

Election results

See also 
Puerto Rican general election, 1920

References 

Puerto Rico
1920